The 1972 Temple Owls football team was an American football team that represented Temple University as an independent during the 1972 NCAA University Division football season. In its third season under head coach Wayne Hardin, the team compiled a 5–4 record and was outscored by a total of 176 to 164. The team played its home games at Temple Stadium in Philadelphia. 

The team's statistical leaders included Doug Shobert with 1,416 passing yards, Paul Loughran with 593 rushing yards and 36 points scored, and Clint Graves with 707 receiving yards.

Schedule

References

Temple
Temple Owls football seasons
Temple Owls football